"Birds of a Feather" is a single by English post-punk band Killing Joke. It was released as a 7" and 12" single in October 1982 by E.G. Records in the UK, Polydor in the Netherlands and E.G. and Passport Records in the US. The 12" release also included the track "Sun Goes Down". The single reached No. 64 in the UK Singles Chart.

The single was Killing Joke's first release with new bass guitarist Paul Raven. Its musical style was more melodic than their previous albums, a direction that continued with the album "Fire Dances" and the non-album singles "Me or You?" (1983) and "A New Day" (1984).

Track listing 
The B-side to all releases was "Flock the B-side", a dub remix of the title track.

 7" Single

 12" Single

Charts

References 

1982 songs
Killing Joke songs
E.G. Records singles
Polydor Records singles
Songs written by Jaz Coleman
Songs written by Geordie Walker
Songs written by Paul Raven (musician)
Songs written by Paul Ferguson